Outwood Grange Academies Trust (OGAT) is a multi-academy trust (MAT) that operates forty schools (twenty-eight secondary and twelve primary) across northern England and the East Midlands. It is an exempt charity, regulated by the Department for Education.

The trust was founded in 2009, led by Sir Michael Wilkins who was principal of the trust's namesake, Outwood Grange Academy. Its current CEO is Martyn Oliver, who previously served as a principal of schools within the trust.

The trust operates using an "80:20" principle, where about 80% of how its schools operate is standardised and 20% is open to local innovation.

Windfall
In 2015, the Conservative Education Minister, Nicky Morgan, announced she was giving five multi-academy trusts, including Outwood Grange Academies Trust, a million pounds each for “improving performance for pupils in some of the most challenging and disadvantaged areas of the country”. The money was awarded to raise standards in deprived areas in South Yorkshire, Bradford, Greater Manchester, Northumberland and Tees Valley. The Northern Powerhouse minister said,  James Wharton said, " 'experience, leadership, and the chains’ strong track record of success'  will mean northern school children can now fulfil their potential." It was pointed out at the time that Sir Michael Wilkins had been previously criticised for taking £500,000 consultancy fees over and above his salary; then a financial audit by Wakefield Council reportedly uncovered an “excessive rewards culture” with lavish spending on foreign trips.

Academic performance
In July 2016, a report by the Education Policy Institute found that at the secondary level "Outwood Grange is the best large academy group (10 schools or more)".
In the multi-academy trust league tables released January 2017, the trust was ranked in the top 5 nationally for secondary progress, and also for both primary writing and maths progress.

Discipline
The academy trust operates a zero tolerance discipline policy with children internally isolated or excluded and sent home for any minor breach of the uniform code as well as serious offences. 
In September 2018 The Guardian published an article criticising the use of isolation booths as a form of punishment within schools, describing them as a form of internal exclusion (where exclusion is a policy by which pupils are forbidden from attending school for a period of time as a punishment).

A report from the Department for Education, highlighted in The Guardian article in August 2018 revealing that 45 English schools had excluded over 20% of their pupils in the last academic year. Outwood Grange was stated to run 9 of them, with Outwood Academy Ormesby in Middlesbrough topping the list by excluding 41% of pupils in the last academic year. Notes were drawn in the earlier article to the risk of disabled pupils with challenging behaviour being overly at risk of exclusion. The trusts' policy for “consequence rooms”, as isolation booths were called, stated pupils must not "tap, chew, swing on their chairs, shout out, sigh, or [engage in] any other unacceptable or disruptive behaviour" and a spokesperson stated "The trust employs all reasonable adjustments for students with special needs within their behaviour policy". However the banned activities include many self-stimulatory behaviours used by people on the Autism Spectrum to cope when under stress, and would be considered reasonable adjustments under the Equality Act 2010.

A parent of a child who was subjected to this treatment for 35 school days, has taken a Yorkshire school to court to challenge the legitimacy of “consequence rooms”, lawyers have applied for a judicial review. The issues to be judged are to be loss of education, the lack of a review procedure, the lack of monitoring by Department of Education who is now responsible as academies are free of Local Authority oversight. The trust has failed to promote the pupil's welfare and did so in an “irrational” manner. The trust failed to have regard to the Equality Act 2010, as pupils with special educational needs or poor mental health are being placed in isolation against their best interests. The trust has failed to comply with article 8 of the European Convention of Human Rights. The school trust responded saying "other of their schools were outstanding".

In September 2019, the trust launched a new behaviour policy. Schools Week reported that the new policy included "more praise, a further safeguard to pick up – and provide support for – those pupils stuck on the “merry go round” of sanctions, and more teaching for pupils about how to behave."
Ofsted  noted that this resulted in much-improved behaviour and, consequently, a significant reduction in the need to use exclusions."

In 2019 former teachers at Outwood Academy Bishopsgarth reported a practice of intimidating and humiliating assemblies, which the trust denied; other teachers reported that these assemblies were trust policy and took place at other schools in the trust.

On 1 May 2019, the trust announced its intention that pupils will have to repeat a year, and be separated from their peer group, if their behaviour is deemed inadequate. The trust insists this is their legal right, no extra support is being provided for the students in spite of a warning that this type of zero tolerance creates child mental health problems, and violence against teachers.

Schools

Primary

 Outwood Junior Academy Brumby, Scunthorpe
 Outwood Primary Academy Alne, Easingwold
 Outwood Primary Academy Bell Lane, Pontefract
 Outwood Primary Academy Darfield, Barnsley
 Outwood Primary Academy Greystone, Ripon
 Outwood Primary Academy Kirkhamgate, Wakefield
 Outwood Primary Academy Ledger Lane, Wakefield
 Outwood Primary Academy Littleworth Grange, Barnsley
 Outwood Primary Academy Lofthouse Gate, Wakefield
 Outwood Primary Academy Newstead Green, Wakefield
 Outwood Primary Academy Park Hill, Wakefield
 Outwood Primary Academy Woodlands, Doncaster

Secondary

 Outwood Academy Acklam, Middlesbrough
 Outwood Academy Adwick, Doncaster
 Outwood Academy Bishopsgarth, Stockton-on-Tees
 Outwood Academy Brumby, Scunthorpe
 Outwood Academy Bydales, Redcar
 Outwood Academy Carlton, Barnsley
 Outwood Academy City, Sheffield
 Outwood Academy City Fields, Wakefield
 Outwood Academy Danum, Doncaster
 Outwood Academy Easingwold, Easingwold
 Outwood Academy Foxhills, Scunthorpe
 Outwood Academy Freeston, Wakefield
 Outwood Academy Hasland Hall, Chesterfield
 Outwood Academy Haydock, Haydock
 Outwood Academy Hemsworth, Wakefield
 Outwood Academy Hindley, Hindley
 Outwood Academy Kirkby, Kirkby-in-Ashfield
 Outwood Academy Newbold, Chesterfield
 Outwood Academy Normanby, Middlesbrough
 Outwood Academy Ormesby, Middlesbrough
 Outwood Academy Portland, Worksop
 Outwood Academy Redcar, Redcar
 Outwood Academy Ripon, Ripon
 Outwood Academy Riverside, Middlesbrough
 Outwood Academy Shafton, Barnsley
 Outwood Academy Valley, Worksop
 Outwood Alternative Provision Eston, Middlesbrough
 Outwood Grange Academy, Wakefield

References

External links
 

 
Educational charities based in the United Kingdom
Educational institutions established in 2009
2009 establishments in England
Academy trusts